The 1969 FIBA Intercontinental Cup was the 4th edition of the FIBA Intercontinental Cup for men's basketball clubs. It took place at Macon, Georgia, United States. From the FIBA European Champions Cup participated Real Madrid and Spartak ZJŠ Brno, and from the South American Club Championship participated Sírio. Macon Movers took part from the NCAA, and from the NABL participated the Akron Goodyear Wingfoots.

Participants

Qualifying game
January 24, Macon Coliseum, Macon

|}

Semi finals
January 25, Macon Coliseum, Macon

|}

3rd place game
January 26, Macon Coliseum, Macon

|}

Final
January 26, Macon Coliseum, Macon

|}

Final standings

References

External links
1969 Intercontinental Basketball Cup

1968
1968–69 in American basketball
1968–69 in European basketball
1968–69 in South American basketball
International basketball competitions hosted by the United States